Cara Judea Alhadeff (born April 8, 1971) is an American photographer, performance artist, writer, activist, and yoga teacher. She has work in the permanent collection of the San Francisco Museum of Modern Art. Her photographs have been called "unsettling" and "subtly disturbing". In 2009 Alhadeff received the BRIO award. Professor of Transdisciplinary Ecological Leadership, Alhadeff has published dozens of interdisciplinary books and articles on critical philosophy, climate justice, art, epigenetics, gender, sexuality, and ethnic studies, including the critically-acclaimed Zazu Dreams: Between the Scarab and the Dung Beetle, A Cautionary Fable for the Anthropocene Era and Viscous Expectations: Justice, Vulnerability, The Ob-scene. Alhadeff's theoretical and visual work is the subject of documentaries for international films and public television. She has been interviewed by The New York Times, San Francisco Chronicle, Pacifica Radio, NPR, and the New Art Examiner. Alongside Archbishop Desmond Tutu and Vandana Shiva, Alhadeff received the Random Kindness Community Resilience Leadership Award, 2020. Her work has been endorsed by Noam Chomsky, Karen Barad, Bill McKibben, James E. Hansen, Paul Hawken, SHK-G Humpty Hump, Eve Ensler, Henry Giroux, Alphonso Lingus, Avital Ronell, and Lucy Lippard among other activists, scholars, and artists. Alhadeff's photographs/performance-videos have been defended by freedom-of-speech organizations (Electronic Freedom Foundation, artsave/People for the AmericanWay, and the ACLU), and are in private and public collections including and San Francisco MoMA, MoMA Salzburg, Austria, the Kinsey Institute for Research in Sex, Gender, and reproduction, and include collaborations with international choreographers, composers, poets, sculptors, architects, scientists. Her art-based and pedagogical practices, parenting, and commitment to solidarity economics and lived social-ecological ethics are intimately bound. Former professor of Philosophy, Performance, and Pedagogy at UC Santa Cruz and Program Director for Jews Of The Earth, Alhadeff and her family live in their eco-art installation repurposed school bus where they perform and teach creative-zero-waste living, social permaculture, and cultural diversity.

Published works
 2022 Philosophy as Practice in the Ecological Emergency: An Exploration of Urgent Matters, “Equality: Industrial Capitalism’s Trojan Horse—Environmental Racism, Green Colonialism, and The Renewable Energies Revolution,” Lucy Weir, ed., Palgrave Macmillan
 2022 Mother Pelican, A Journal of Solidarity and Sustainability: “Boycott Civilization, Part XV-XX”
 2022 Medium.com, The Good Men Project, republishing 15 “Becoming Trickster” installments from Mother Pelican Journal
 2021 Tikkun, Journal of Radical Empathy, "Sacred Attunement: Shmita as Cultural Biomimicry," November
 2021 Tikkun, Journal of Radical Empathy, “Blood Chocolate: Lessons from Zazu Dreams,” October
 2021 “Love & Waste: Igniting A Permaculture Paradigm Shift, Part I-IV,” Volume 17, #1-4; “Confusion as a State of Grace: Climate and Kinship in 2021, Part V-X,” Volume 17, #5-10; “Ecological Border Crossings, Part XI-XIV,” Volume 17, #11-14; “Interlude I-VI,” Volume 18, #2-7
 2021 Deep Green Resistance News Service, "Environmental Racism, Green Colonialism, and The Renewable Energies Revolution"
 2021 The Esperanza Project, "When Love Ignites a Creative-WasteRevolution," Part 1-4
 2021 Communities Magazine, "Children in Community," Fall 2021, Issue #193
 2021 Communities Magazine, "Ecological Culture," Summer 2021, Issue #191
 2021 The Good Men Project, 36-part series, "Embodying The Trickster, Transforming the Green Economy"
 The Erotic in Context Inter-Disciplinary Press – Co-edited

References

External links
 2020-Present Artist/Author/Activist Website
 1992-2019 Website
 Pennsylvania Inside Out: Cara Judea Alhadeff (TV interview)

Living people
American performance artists
American yoga teachers
1971 births